David Christopher Poole (born 1959) is a British-American scientist who researches oxygen transport in health and disease focusing on the mechanisms of exercise intolerance.

Academic work
He is a University Distinguished Professor and Coffman Chair for Distinguished Undergraduate Teaching Scholars in the Departments of Kinesiology and Anatomy & Physiology at Kansas State University. His laboratory has been funded by the National Institutes of Health and the American Heart Association.

Research
His models of capillary function, oxygen uptake kinetics and Critical Power have become de rigueur in exercise physiology.

Affiliations with organisations
He was elected President of the American College of Sports Medicine (ACSM) Central State Chapter in 2001 and Chair for the Environmental and Exercise Physiology section of the American Physiological Society (APS) in 2021. He presented the APS’s Adolph Distinguished Lecture in 2018 entitled: “Muscle Microcirculation: Gateway to Function and Dysfunction".

A Fellow of the American College of Sports Medicine (ACSM), he delivered the Joseph B. Wolffe Memorial Lecture entitled “How Do YOU Power Aerobic Exercise” at the ACSM’s 2021 annual meeting and received the ACSM Citation Award in 2019.

Secondary Sources

References 

American physiologists
Kansas State University faculty
University of California, Los Angeles alumni
Alumni of Liverpool John Moores University
University of California, San Diego faculty
Living people
1959 births
British physiologists
British emigrants to the United States